Marc Monnet (born 11 March 1947, in Paris) is a French composer of contemporary music, mainly electroacoustic music, who develops the notion of humour in music.

Selected works 
 Patatras, for clarinet, bassoon, 2 violas, 2 cellos and 2 double basses (1984)
 Chant, for solo cello (1984)
 Rigaudon, for horn quartet (1985)
 Les Ténèbres de Marc Monnet, for string quartet (1985)
 Siècle pierre tombeau, for ensemble and electronics (1984)
 Close, for string quartet (1993–1994)
 Wa-wa, for four horns and four trombones (1987)
 Fantasia bruta, for viola solo (1982)
 Chants ténus, for old instruments and electronics (1992)
 Babioles, six pieces for alto saxophone and one piece for tenor saxophone or basset horn (1992)
 Chant fêlé, for flute, clarinet, violin, cello, piano and real time transformations (1996)
 Mouvement, imprévus, et..., for orchestra, violin and other thingies (2013)

External links 
 
 Marc Monnet, la libre fantaisie de l'invention (France Musique)
 "Le compositeur Marc Monnet est l'invité de Musique Matin" (France Musique)
 
 "Printemps des arts de Monte-Carlo, Marc Monnet à la manoeuvre" (Le Figaro)
 
 Biography, musiquecontemporaine.info (in French)
 Marc Monnet (Anaclase)
 

20th-century French composers
Conservatoire de Paris alumni
French male composers
Musicians from Paris
1947 births
Living people
20th-century French male musicians